Ivan Zaffron (8 June 1807 – 16 September 1881) was a Croatian prelate of the Catholic Church who served as bishop of Šibenik from 1863 until 1872 and bishop of Dubrovnik and apostolic administrator of Trebinje-Mrkan from 1872 until his death in 1881.

Biography 

Ivan Zaffron was born Korčula to a noble family. His father was a Venetian captain and mother Ivanka née Depolo. He was baptised in the Korčula Cathedral on 12 July 1807 by Fr. Roko Zaffron.

Zaffron was educated in Zadar and later studied theology in Mariabrunn near Vienna. He was ordained a priest by Bishop Antun Giuriceo in Mandaljena on 2 September 1832. After his ordination, Zaffron served as parson in Smokvice and Čare. He was appointed religious teacher at school in Korčula on 15 December 1837. While a parson in Korčula, he ordered three smaller churches of Saint Roch, Saint Blaise and Saint Sergius be demolished, and built a larger mausoleum-like Church of Saint Justina. Zaffron also constructed the first meteorological station in Korčula, and was its first observer.

On 13 November 1862, he was selected to succeed Petar Dujam Maupas as bishop of Šibenik, who was appointed archbishop of Zadar. Zaffron was confirmed on 28 September 1863. He was consecrated on 15 November 1863 by Bishop of Kotor Marko Kalogjera at the Church of Saint Mark.

After the death of Bishop Vinko Zubranić of Dubrovnik in 1870, the episcopal seat of Dubrovnik remained vacant for almost two years, when Zaffron was selected to succeed him on 13 February 1872. He was finally confirmed on 29 July 1872. Simultaneously, he gained administration over the Diocese of Trebinje-Mrkan in the Ottoman Empire, which was at the time administered by the bishops of Dubrovnik. As bishop of Dubrovnik, Zaffron supported the Autonomist Party.

Immediately after taking the office, Zaffron sent a letter to foreign minister of Austria-Hungary Gyula Andrássy suggesting a number of measures to improve the lives of the Catholics in the Diocese of Trebinje-Mrkan, among which was the introduction of Jesuits or Trappists, and Sisters of Mercy or Handmaids of Charity for the girl education. He also asked the government to help with new schools and larger donations. However, his plans were obstructed after Christian uprising broke out against the Ottomans.

After the uprising, the Treaty of Berlin allowed Austria-Hungary to occupy Bosnia and Herzegovina. During the talks about the organisation of the Church in Bosnia and Herzegovina, Governor of Dalmatia General Gavrilo Rodić and Zaffron opposed the idea that Trebinje-Mrkan should be exempted from the jurisdiction of the bishop of Dubrovnik, however, the Catholic population and clergy wanted their own bishop. Zaffron later supported the initiative, and proposed Apostolic Vicar of Egypt Bishop Ljudevit Ćurčija as a new bishop of Trebinje-Mrkan.

However, the Austrian-Hungarian government couldn't meet these requests due to financial obligations and the consideration for the Eastern Orthodox, as it couldn't allow the Catholics who were fewer in numbers, to have more bishops than the Eastern Orthodox, so they agreed in the Convention of 1881 to leave Trebinje-Mrkan under the administration of the bishop of Dubrovnik.

After a period of illness, Zaffron died in Korčula on 16 September 1881. He is buried in the Church of Saint Justina in Korčula.

Notes

References

Books

Journals

Websites 

 
 
 

1807 births
1881 deaths
People from Korčula
Croatian people of Italian descent
Bishops of Šibenik
Bishops of Dubrovnik
Apostolic Administrators of Trebinje-Mrkan
Bishops appointed by Pope Pius IX
Roman Catholic bishops in the Kingdom of Dalmatia
19th-century Roman Catholic bishops in Bosnia and Herzegovina